The Sacred Heart School is a historic former school building in Fall River, Massachusetts.  It is a large two-story brick Georgian Revival building, with stone beltcourses above and below the main floors.  The Pine Street facade has a slightly bowed entrance pavilion with three entrances, each set in a round arch.  The building was designed by the Boston firm of Maginnis and Walsh, known for its ecclesiastical designs.

The school building was constructed in 1931-32 as the second home for the Catholic school which was founded in 1887. The school was closed in 1982 and the school building was sold to a private developer for housing. The building added to the National Register of Historic Places in 1987.

See also
National Register of Historic Places listings in Fall River, Massachusetts

References

School buildings on the National Register of Historic Places in Massachusetts
Defunct Catholic schools in the United States
Defunct schools in Massachusetts
Buildings and structures in Fall River, Massachusetts
National Register of Historic Places in Fall River, Massachusetts
1932 establishments in Massachusetts